Agricultural and Forest Meteorology is a peer-reviewed scientific journal covering research on the relationships between meteorology and the fields of plant, animal, and soil sciences, ecology, and biogeochemistry. The editor-in-chief is Claudia Wagner-Riddle (University of Guelph).

According to the Journal Citation Reports, the journal has a 2020 impact factor of 5.734, ranking it 2nd out of 67 journals in the category "Forestry".

References

External links
 

Agricultural journals
Meteorology journals
Publications established in 1964
Monthly journals
English-language journals
Elsevier academic journals
Forestry journals